Beck, Bogert & Appice was a rock supergroup and power trio formed by English guitarist Jeff Beck, evolving from the Jeff Beck Group. It included bassist Tim Bogert and drummer Carmine Appice, Americans who had played together in Vanilla Fudge and Cactus.

History 
Beck had been keen to work with Tim Bogert and Carmine Appice after encountering the two in 1967 and after subsequent meetings and sessions such as those which took place between July 6 and 10, 1969. In early August 1969, Beck commented to Alan Smith from New Musical Express:

On September 13, 1969, Melody Maker reported in its "Raver" column that Beck had added Carmine Appice and Tim Bogert to his band. Beck and his manager Peter Grant arranged to finalize contracts with Bogert and Appice in November 1969. On November 12, 1969, Beck crashed his car, and all future plans were put on hold. Beck soon recovered from his accident, and in early March 1971, he formed the Jeff Beck Group.

The official demise of the second Jeff Beck Group was announced on July 24, 1972. On the next day Jeff Beck met with keyboardist Max Middleton, Tim Bogert and Carmine Appice. He also brought in Kim Milford as vocalist. Rehearsals at the Rolling Stones' rehearsal rooms in Bermondsey began in preparation for an imminent tour of the U.S., originally arranged for the Jeff Beck Group. In an interview with Danny Holloway from New Musical Express on July 8, 1972, Beck stated:

On August 1, 1972, the band appeared at the Stanley Theater in Pittsburgh as Jeff Beck Group. After only six appearances, Milford was replaced by Bobby Tench, who was flown in from the UK after the performance at the Arie Crown Theatre in Chicago, and who appeared with the band for the rest of the tour. The tour concluded at the Paramount Theatre in Seattle on August 19, 1972. After this U.S. tour, Tench and Middelton left the band and Beck formed a power trio with Appice and Bogert. Drummer Appice took the role of vocalist with help from Bogert and Beck. Still billed as Jeff Beck Group, the trio was included on the bill for Rock at The Oval (held at The Oval) on September 16, which marked the start of a tour schedule of the UK, Netherlands, and Germany. On Friday October 20, 1972, a U.S. tour began at the Hollywood Sportatorium in Florida and concluded on November 11, 1972, at The Warehouse in New Orleans.

Beck, Bogert & Appice started work on its eponymous debut album Beck, Bogert & Appice at Chess Studios on December 11, 1972, with sessions continuing until December 22. Recording sessions resumed on January 2, 1973, with producer Don Nix, and the trio transferred to The Village in Los Angeles. Don Nix told John Tobler from the magazine ZigZag: "I don't know how I got the job, but I'd sure like to get out of it". The album was released in the U.S. on March 26, 1973, and on April 6 the same year in the UK. It reached No. 12 on the U.S. album chart and No. 28 on the UK album chart on May 10, 1973. James Isaacs, from Rolling Stone wrote:

On February 1, 1973, the trio embarked on a UK tour that took in concert halls and university campus venues, and ended at the Top Rank in Cardiff on February 18, 1973. On February 20, the group appeared on the French TV show Pop Deux in front of 2,000 fans. On March 28, 1973, the band started its U.S. tour at the Music Hall, and Beck unveiled a new effect by using the Talk box for the first time. The trio finished the first part of its tour on April 16, 1973, at Winterland in San Francisco, having played 18 venues. After another tour break the band resumed its tour of the U.S., starting at the Seattle Centre Arena on April 26 and finishing at the Honolulu International Centre on May 8; it flew on to a Japanese tour which started at Nippon Budokan on May 14 and ended five days later on May 19, 1973, at Koseinenkin Hall in Osaka.

A tour of Europe started on July 8, 1973, and took in the annual European rock festival circuit. The group traveled to venues in West Germany and the Netherlands, then arrived in Paris to conclude the tour on July 14, 1973. Another U.S. tour hastily was arranged to cover the East Coast and Southern states, such as Pennsylvania, North Carolina, Florida, Maryland, and Georgia. The tour started on July 11, 1973, and came to an abrupt end when Beck left on July 17.

Live in Japan was released on October 21, 1973. This album was a compilation of performances recorded in Osaka during the May tour in Japan. On November 21, 1973, the band traveled to France to start its second European tour as Beck, Bogert & Appice. After a Christmas break, the band started a British tour, which began at Newcastle on January 10. Fourteen shows followed, taking them to Brighton, Leeds, Liverpool, Sheffield, Bristol, London, Glasgow and Edinburgh. The tour ended on February 29 at the Caley Picture House in Edinburgh.

On January 26, 1974, the band played at the Rainbow Theatre as part of a European tour. This concert was broadcast in full on the U.S. show Rock Around the World on September 9, 1974. This was the last recorded work by the band, and previewed songs intended for a second studio album were included on the bootleg At Last Rainbow. A medley with "You Shook Me" and "BBA Boogie" was included on the Jeff Beck compilation Beckology (1991). Recording sessions for a second studio album began in January 1974. On May 18, 1974, New Musical Express wrote "Rumours concerning an imminent split in BBA, which have been rife for several weeks, were confirmed by bassist Tim Bogert". Melody Maker also reported the breakup of the band at that time. The band dissolved before the completion of a second studio album.

At Last Rainbow song list
 "Laughin' Lady" (5:53)
 "Lady" (7:05)
 "Morning Dew" (12:22)
 "Superstition" (6:07)
 "(Get Ready) Your Lovemaker's Comin' Home" (7:40)
 "Blues De Luxe – You Shook Me" (5:34)
 "Rainbow Boogie" (11:32)  ["BBA Boogie"]

Musicians

Band members 
 Jeff Beck – guitar, occasional vocals
 Tim Bogert – bass guitar, lead and backing vocals
 Carmine Appice – drums, lead and backing vocals

Vocalists 
 Kim Milford 6 live shows. August 4 to 7, 1972 with Beck, Bogert and Appice, billed as Jeff Beck Group. Milford left the band after the Majestic Theater concert in Dallas.
 Bobby Tench 13 live shows. August 8 to September 19, 1972, with Beck, Bogert and Appice, billed as Jeff Beck Group. Tench joined the band for The Arie Crown Theater concert, in Chicago.

Keyboardist 
 Max Middleton 19 live shows. Left the group with Bobby Tench.

Guest appearances 
 Danny Hutton and Jimmy Greenspoon on track «Three Dog Night» in backing vocals and keyboards respectively.
 Pete French and Duane Hitchings on track «Lady» as co-writers.

Timeline

Discography 
Studio albums
 Beck, Bogert & Appice (1973) US #12, RIAA certification Gold

Live albums
 Beck, Bogert & Appice Live (in Japan) (1973)

Compilation albums
 BBA tracks appear on Beckology (1991)

Singles
 "Black Cat Moan" / "Livin' Alone" (UK, February 16, 1973)
 "I'm So Proud" / "Oh to Love You" (U.S., May 28, 1973)
 "Lady" / "Oh to Love You" (U.S., July 16, 1973)

References

Further reading
 Hjort, Chris and Hinman, Doug. Jeff's book : A chronology of Jeff Beck's career 1965–1980 : from the Yardbirds to Jazz-Rock. Rock 'n' Roll Research Press, (2000). 
 Carson, Annette. Jeff Beck: Crazy Fingers. Backbeat books (2002)

External links 
 BBA interview with Lenny Kaye, Rolling Stone, May 10, 1973, at Rocks Back Pages
 BBA interview with Chris Welch, Melody Maker. September 29, 1973, at Rocks Back Pages
 BBA Interview with Charles Shaar Murray, New Musical Express, September 29, 1973, at Rocks Back Pages
 BBA at Legacy recordings
 

1972 establishments in Pennsylvania
1974 disestablishments in Pennsylvania
English blues rock musical groups
English hard rock musical groups
Epic Records artists
Rock music supergroups
Musical groups established in 1972
Musical groups disestablished in 1974
British musical trios